The New York City mayoral election of 2001 was held on November 6, 2001.

Incumbent Republican mayor Rudy Giuliani could not run again due to term limits. As Democrats outnumbered Republicans by a five-to-one margin in the city, it was widely believed that a Democrat would succeed him in City Hall. Businessman Michael Bloomberg, a lifelong Democrat, changed his party affiliation and ran as a Republican. Mark J. Green narrowly defeated Fernando Ferrer in the Democratic primary, surviving a negative contest that divided the party and consumed the vast majority of the Green campaign's financial resources. After a campaign that was largely overshadowed by the 9/11 terrorist attacks, Bloomberg won the general election with 50.3% of the vote to Green's 47.9%.

Background
The primaries originally began on September 11. However, the September 11 attacks caused the primary to be postponed until September 25 (votes cast on September 11 were not counted), and the run-off occurred on October 11.

Republican primary

Candidates
Michael Bloomberg, billionaire businessman
Herman Badillo, former Democratic U.S. Representative from The Bronx (1971–77)

Results

By borough

Democratic primary

Candidates
 Fernando Ferrer, Borough President of The Bronx
 Mark J. Green, New York City Public Advocate
 Alan Hevesi, New York City Comptroller
 George Spitz
 Peter Vallone Sr., New York City Councilman

Campaign
Late in the primary, Green was roundly criticized for the actions of supporters that were construed as racist, involving literature with New York Post caricatures of Ferrer and Al Sharpton distributed in white enclaves of Brooklyn and Staten Island. Green stated that he had nothing to do with the dissemination of the literature. An investigation by the Brooklyn District Attorney came to the conclusion that "Mark Green had no knowledge of these events, and that when he learned of them, he repeatedly denounced the distribution of this literature and sought to find out who had engaged in it." Nevertheless, the incident is thought to have diminished minority turnout in the general election and helped the Republican candidate win in an overwhelmingly Democratic city. (Village Voice columnist Peter Noel wrote that "Mark Green... may have replaced [Giuliani] as the most hated white man in the African American community," an ironic twist for someone who had been so popular in that community for so long.)

Green made a controversial decision during the primary run-off to support Giuliani's unprecedented attempt to extend his own mayoral term, in the name of the emergency of 9/11. Ferrer opposed Giuliani's ultimately unsuccessful attempt at term self-extension, and was able to accuse Green of being rolled over by Giuliani.

Results

Green clearly led among Manhattan's Democrats, Ferrer among The Bronx's and Vallone among Staten Island's. Ferrer and Green were evenly matched in Brooklyn, while all three candidates were essentially tied in Queens.

Runoff

General election

Candidates
 Michael R. Bloomberg (Republican)
 Bernie Goetz (Fusion)
 Mark J. Green (Democratic, Working Families)
 Terrance M. Gray (Conservative)
 Alan G. Hevesi (Liberal)
 Julia Willebrand (Green)
 Kenny Kramer (Libertarian)
 Kenneth B. Golding (American Dream)
 Thomas K. Leighton (Marijuana Reform)

Campaign
Rudy Giuliani, who was riding high approval ratings following the 9/11 attacks, publicly endorsed Bloomberg.

Unlike his cash-poor Democratic rival, who had just emerged from an expensive primary and expected to rely on traditionally reliable free media coverage that never materialized, Bloomberg continued to spend $74 million on TV ads and direct mail in the weeks after the attacks, which was a record amount at the time for a non-presidential election (Bloomberg would break his own record in 2005). The Economist wrote, "The billionaire businessman [Bloomberg] is usually seen as one of the post-September 11th winners (if such a word can be so used): he would probably have lost the mayoralty to Mark Green, a leftish Democrat, had the terrorist strike not happened. Yet it is also worth noting that his election probably spared New York city a turbulent period of score-settling over Rudy Giuliani's legacy."

Green posed on the steps of City Hall with Hasidic Jewish leaders and issued a statement saying that "leaders from the Satmar Congregations of New York City, the largest of the three major Hasidic groups in the city with some 100,000 followers" supported his mayoral campaign. But many of the Satmars at that photo op led an upstate Satmar community ineligible to vote in New York City, and were also "at odds with the Satmar establishment" based in Williamsburg, Brooklyn, whose leaders were in Europe at the time and unaware that Green had claimed their endorsements.

The election was also notable for two non-politician semi-celebrities running on third-party tickets: Bernhard Goetz, who had achieved fame in 1984 as the "subway vigilante" for shooting four young men who tried to rob him, on the Fusion Party ticket, and Kenny Kramer, who was the inspiration for the character Cosmo Kramer on the TV show Seinfeld, on the Libertarian Party ticket.

Results
Bloomberg secured victory in a close election, with 744,757 votes. Although he lost in three of the five boroughs, he was able to collect enough votes in Staten Island and Queens to prevail. Under New York's electoral fusion rules, candidates were allowed to run representing multiple parties.

Notes

References

See also 

Mayoral election
2001
New York City mayoral
New York
November 2001 events in the United States
Michael Bloomberg